(also known as House-hunting) was written and directed by Hayao Miyazaki for Studio Ghibli. The short film originally released on January 3, 2006, and is shown only in the Saturn Theater at the Ghibli Museum in Mitaka, Japan. The short is 12 minutes long.

Story
Fuki sets out with a big rucksack in high spirits on a journey to look for a new house. Along her way, Fuki encounters and befriends numerous manifestations of the natural world, from fish to insects to a kami who resembled Totoro. All the sound effects in this film were done by human voice. This short film contains little to no spoken Japanese, and the story is conveyed almost entirely through art and sound effects. Sound is also depicted on screen as animated writing.  The original story and screenplay were written by Hayao Miyazaki.

References

External links 
 
 

Anime short films
Fantasy anime and manga
Films directed by Hayao Miyazaki
2000s Japanese-language films
2006 films
2006 anime films
Studio Ghibli animated films
2000s animated short films